William Kanengiser  (born July 22, 1959) is a classical guitarist. He is one of the founding members of the Los Angeles Guitar Quartet (LAGQ).

Kanengiser was born in Orange, New Jersey. He holds a Bachelor of Music and Master of Music from the Thornton School of Music at the University of Southern California, where he also serves as a faculty member.

Kanengiser has won Grammy Awards with the Los Angeles Guitar Quartet, which received the award for best classical crossover album at the 47th Grammy Awards for Guitar Heroes; he has also won for his contribution to Atlanta Symphony Orchestra's performance of Golijov's Ainadamar: Fountain Of Tears, which won the Grammy Award for Best Opera Recording in 2007.

Notes
Gregg Wager, "Music Reviews: William Kanengiser in Guitar Recital at Ambassador", in: Los Angeles Times, March 14, 1990

References

External links
 William Kanengiser's Official Website
 Allmusic biography of William Kanengiser

1959 births
American classical guitarists
American male guitarists
Grammy Award winners
Living people
USC Thornton School of Music alumni
USC Thornton School of Music faculty
20th-century American guitarists
20th-century American male musicians